Thomas Wilson was a priest in Ireland during the first half of the 17th century: he was Dean of Lismore from 1611 until 1614 and Dean of Dromore from 1621 until 1622.

References

Deans of Dromore
Deans of Lismore
Year of birth missing
Year of death missing
17th-century Irish Anglican priests